In Arab cuisine salads may precede a meal, served in huge variety on small plates as part of a mezze, or accompany it. Tabbouleh, a salad of finely chopped parsley, with tomatoes, mint, onion, and soaked bulgur, is one of the most popular Arab salads. Mixed vegetable salads, and salads of cooked eggplant or chick peas are common. Green salad, which is better known as the "Salata Khadra", usually requires six cucumbers a little ground black pepper, a few tomatoes, a bundle of fresh parsley, salt and juice of one lemon. This traditional Arabic salad is one of the easiest to prepare. Herbs and spices are common and abundant in Arab salads.

Pita, also known as "Arabic bread", and other flat breads are commonly served alongside salads, as are leavened breads and varieties of other sour doughs. Arabic salads are not very complex or difficult to prepare.

Varieties of Arab salad

See also
 Arab cuisine
 List of salads

References

External links

Arab cuisine
 
Lists of foods by type